Diplomatic immunity is a principle of international law by which certain foreign government officials are recognized as having legal immunity from the jurisdiction of another country. It allows diplomats safe passage and freedom of travel in a host country and accords almost total protection from local lawsuits and prosecution. 

Diplomatic immunity is one of the oldest and most widespread practices in international relations; most civilizations since antiquity have granted some degree of special status to foreign envoys and messengers. It is designed to facilitate relations between states by allowing their respective representatives to conduct their duties freely and safely, even during periods of political tension and armed conflict. Moreover, such protections are generally understood to be reciprocal and therefore mutually beneficial. 

As a longstanding and nearly universal concept, diplomatic immunity has long been considered customary law; however, it was traditionally granted on a bilateral, ad hoc basis, leading to varying and sometimes conflicting standards of protection. Modern practices of diplomatic immunity have largely conformed to the 1961 Vienna Convention on Diplomatic Relations, which formally codified the legal and political status of diplomats, and has been ratified by the vast majority of sovereign states. 

Contrary to popular belief, diplomats are not entirely immune from the jurisdiction of their host country. Like most foreign persons, they may still be declared persona non grata and expelled. A foreign official's home country may waive immunity, typically in the event that they are involved in some manner in a serious crime unrelated to their diplomatic role (as opposed to, for example, allegations of spying). However, many countries refuse to waive immunity as a matter of course, and diplomats have no authority to waive their own immunity (except perhaps in cases of defection). Alternatively, the home country may prosecute the individual on its own accord or through the insistence of the host country.

History

Ancient

The concept of diplomatic immunity can be found in ancient Indian epics like Ramayana and Mahabharata, where messengers and diplomats were given immunity from capital punishment. In Ramayana, when the demon king Ravana ordered the killing of Hanuman, Ravana's younger brother Vibhishana pointed out that messengers or diplomats should not be killed, as per ancient practices.

During the evolution of international justice, many wars were considered rebellions or unlawful by one or more combatant sides. In such cases, the servants of the "criminal" sovereign were often considered accomplices and their persons violated. In other circumstances, harbingers of inconsiderable demands were killed as a declaration of war. Herodotus records that when heralds of the Persian king Xerxes demanded "earth and water" (i.e., symbols of submission) of Greek cities, the Athenians threw them into a pit and the Spartans threw them down a well for the purpose of suggesting they would find both earth and water at the bottom, these often being mentioned by the messenger as a threat of siege. However, even for Herodotus, this maltreatment of envoys is a crime. He recounts a story of divine vengeance befalling Sparta for this deed.

A Roman envoy was urinated on as he was leaving the city of Tarentum. The oath of the envoy, "This stain will be washed away with blood!", was fulfilled during the Pyrrhic War. The arrest and ill-treatment of the envoy of Raja Raja Chola by the king of Kulasekhara dynasty (Second Cheras), which is now part of modern India, led to the naval Kandalur War in AD 994.

The Islamic prophet Muhammad sent and received envoys and strictly forbade harming them. This practice was continued by the Rashidun caliphs who exchanged diplomats with the Ethiopians and the Byzantines. This diplomatic exchange continued during the Arab–Byzantine wars.

Classical Sharia called for hospitality to be shown towards anyone who has been granted amān (or right of safe passage). Amān was readily granted to any emissary bearing a letter or another sealed document. The duration of the amān was typically a year. Envoys with this right of passage were given immunity of person and property. They were exempt from taxation, as long as they didn't engage in trade.

As diplomats by definition enter the country under safe conduct, violating them is normally viewed as a great breach of honor. Genghis Khan and the Mongols were well known for insisting on the rights of diplomats, and would often take terrifying vengeance against any state that violated these rights; at times razing entire cities in retaliation for the execution of their ambassadors. The Mongols invaded and destroyed the Khwarezmid Empire after their ambassadors were mistreated.

16th–19th century

The British Parliament first guaranteed diplomatic immunity to foreign ambassadors under the Diplomatic Privileges Act in 1709, after Count Andrey Matveyev, a Russian resident in London, was subjected to verbal and physical abuse by British bailiffs.

Modern diplomatic immunity evolved parallel to the development of modern diplomacy. In the 17th century, European diplomats realized that protection from prosecution was essential to doing their jobs, and a set of rules evolved guaranteeing the rights of diplomats. These were still confined to Western Europe and were closely tied to the prerogatives of nobility. Thus, an emissary to the Ottoman Empire could expect to be arrested and imprisoned upon the outbreak of hostilities between his state and the empire. The French Revolution also disrupted this system, as the revolutionary state and Napoleon imprisoned numerous diplomats who were accused of working against France. More recently, the Iran hostage crisis is universally considered a violation of diplomatic immunity. Although the hostage takers did not officially represent the state, host countries are obligated to protect diplomatic property and personnel. On the other hand, during World War II, diplomatic immunity was upheld and the embassies of the belligerents were evacuated through neutral countries.

For the upper class of the 17th, 18th, and 19th centuries, diplomatic immunity was an easy concept to understand. The first embassies were not permanent establishments but actual visits by high-ranking representatives, often close relatives, of the sovereign or the sovereign in person. As permanent representations evolved, usually on a treaty basis between two powers, they were frequently staffed by relatives of the sovereign or high-ranking nobles.

Warfare was a status of hostilities not between individuals but between their sovereigns, as well as the officers and officials of European governments, and armies often changed employers. Truces and ceasefires were commonplace, as was the fraternization between officers of opposing armies. If officers were taken prisoner, they usually gave their parole and were only restricted to a city away from the theatre of war. Almost always, they were given leave to carry their personal sidearms. Even during the French Revolutionary Wars, British scientists visited the French Academy. In such an atmosphere, it was easy to accept that some persons were immune to the laws. After all, they were still bound by strict requirements of honour and customs.

Modern era and Vienna convention
In the 19th century, the Congress of Vienna reasserted the rights of diplomats; they have been largely respected since then, as the European model has spread throughout the world. Currently, diplomatic relations, including diplomatic immunity, are governed internationally by the 1961 Vienna Convention on Diplomatic Relations, which has been ratified by almost every country in the world.

In modern times, diplomatic immunity continues to provide a means, albeit imperfect, to safeguard diplomatic personnel from any animosity that might arise between nations. As one article put it: "So why do we agree to a system in which we're dependent on a foreign country's whim before we can prosecute a criminal inside our own borders? The practical answer is: because we depend on other countries to honor our own diplomats' immunity just as scrupulously as we honor theirs."

During 18 April 1961 Vienna Convention, the Holy See was granted diplomatic immunity to its foreign ambassadors as well.

In the United States, the Diplomatic Relations Act of 1978 ( et seq.) follows the principles introduced by the Vienna Conventions. The United States tends to be generous when granting diplomatic immunity to visiting diplomats, because a large number of US diplomats work in host countries less protective of individual rights. If the United States were to punish a visiting diplomat without sufficient grounds, US representatives in other countries could receive harsher treatment. If a person with immunity is alleged to have committed a crime or faces a civil lawsuit, the State Department asks the home country to waive immunity of the alleged offender so that the complaint can be moved to the courts. If immunity is not waived, prosecution cannot be undertaken. However, the State Department still has the right to expel the diplomat. In many such cases, the diplomat's visas are revoked, and they and their family may be barred from returning to the United States. Crimes committed by members of a diplomat's family can also result in dismissal.

Exceptions to the Vienna Convention
Some countries have made reservations to the Vienna Convention on Diplomatic Relations, but they are minor. A number of countries limit the diplomatic immunity of persons who are citizens of the receiving country. As nations keep faith to their treaties with differing zeal, other rules may also apply, though in most cases this summary is a reasonably accurate approximation. The Convention does not cover the personnel of international organizations, whose privileges are decided upon on a case-by-case basis, usually in the treaties founding such organizations.

UN organisations 
The United Nations system (including its agencies, which comprise the most recognizable international bodies such as the World Bank and many others) has a relatively standardized form of limited immunities for staff traveling on UN laissez-passer; diplomatic immunity is often granted to the highest-ranking officials of these agencies. Consular officials (that do not have concurrent diplomatic accreditation) formally have a more limited form of immunity, generally limited to their official duties. Diplomatic technical and administrative staff also have more limited immunity under the Vienna Convention; for this reason, some countries may accredit a member of technical or administrative staff as an attaché.

Others 
Other categories of government officials that may travel frequently to other countries may not have diplomatic passports or diplomatic immunity, such as members of the military, high-ranking government officials, ministers, and others. For the US military, official passports can be used for work related travels only. Many countries provide non-diplomatic official passports to such personnel, and there may be different classes of such travel documents such as official passports, service passports, and others. De facto recognition of some form of immunity may be conveyed by states accepting officials traveling on such documents, or there may exist bilateral agreements to govern such cases (as in, for example, the case of military personnel conducting or observing exercises on the territory of the receiving country).

Formally, diplomatic immunity may be limited to officials accredited to a host country, or traveling to or from their host country. In practice, many countries may effectively recognize diplomatic immunity for those traveling on diplomatic passports, with admittance to the country constituting acceptance of the diplomatic status. However, this is not universal, and diplomats have been prosecuted and jailed for crimes committed outside the country they are accredited to.

As a result of their title, diplomats are exempt from being prosecuted by the state in open court when they are suspected to be guilty of a crime. Not only are these agents free from the criminal jurisdiction of the state, they are also immune from administrative and civil jurisdiction. This applies for most scenarios, however, there are some exceptions when the diplomatic immunity is subject to waiver.

 Any events that are associated with individual stationary property in the land of the given receiving State – with the exception of whether or not he is directed to do so for a plan. 
 Any events with regards to a diplomat serving as another role from another State, including heir, inheritor of a will, executor, administrator.
 Any activity by a diplomat, in the receiving State, that is related to any professional or commercial operations beyond the scope of his directed responsibilities.

Asadollah Asadi, an Iranian diplomat, was arrested while returning to his residence in Austria on a highway in Germany on June 10, 2018, accused of being involved in an attempted bombing at a gathering of the National Council of Resistance of Iran (a political organisation opposing the Iranian regime). While Assadi was entitled to diplomatic immunity where applicable, it was deemed that he was not protected when he was arrested as he was on holiday (in Germany) outside the country where he was posted and hence protected.

Uses and abuses
In reality, most diplomats are representatives of nations with a tradition of professional civil service; they are expected to obey regulations governing their behaviour and suffer severe disciplinary action if they flout local laws. In many nations, a professional diplomat's career may be compromised if they (or members of their family) disobey the local authorities or cause serious embarrassment, and such cases are, at any rate, a violation of the spirit of the Vienna Conventions.

The Vienna Convention is explicit that "without prejudice to their privileges and immunities, it is the duty of all persons enjoying such privileges and immunities to respect the laws and regulations of the receiving State." Nevertheless, on some occasions, diplomatic immunity leads to some unfortunate results; protected diplomats have violated laws (including those that would be violations at home as well) of the host country and that country has been essentially limited to informing the diplomat's nation that the diplomat is no longer welcome (persona non-grata). Diplomatic agents are not, however, exempt from the jurisdiction of their home state, and hence prosecution may be undertaken by the sending state. For minor violations of the law, the sending state may impose administrative procedures specific to the foreign service or diplomatic mission.

Violation of the law by diplomats has included espionage, smuggling, child custody law violations, money laundering, tax evasion, making terrorist threats, slavery, preying on children over the internet for sex, and murder.

Offences against the person
On-duty police officer Yvonne Fletcher was murdered in London in 1984, by a person shooting from inside the Libyan embassy during a protest. The incident caused a breakdown in diplomatic relations until Libya admitted "general responsibility" in 1999. The incident became a major factor in Prime Minister Margaret Thatcher's decision to allow President of the United States Ronald Reagan to launch the US bombing of Libya in 1986 from American bases in the United Kingdom.

In 1987 in New York City, the Human Resources Administration placed 9-year-old Terrence Karamba in a foster home after his elementary school teachers noticed suspicious scars and injuries. He and his 7-year-old sister, who was also placed in City custody, told officials the wounds had been inflicted by their father, Floyd Karamba, an administrative attaché at the Zimbabwean Mission to the UN. No charges were filed, as Karamba had diplomatic immunity.

In February 1999 in Vancouver, British Columbia, Canada, Kazuko Shimokoji, wife of the Japanese Consul-General, showed up at the emergency department of a city hospital with two black eyes and a bruised neck. She told doctors that her husband had beaten her. When local police questioned her husband, Mr. Shimokoji said, "Yes, I punched her out and she deserved it", and described the incident as "a cultural thing and not a big deal". Although an arrest warrant was issued, Mr. Shimokoji could not be arrested due to his diplomatic immunity. However, his statement to the police was widely reported in both the local and Japanese press. The subsequent public uproar prompted the Japanese Ministry of Foreign Affairs to waive Mr. Shimokoji's immunity. Though he pleaded guilty in Canadian court, he was given an absolute discharge. Nonetheless, he was recalled to Japan where he was reassigned to office duty and had his pay cut.

In 2002, a Colombian diplomat in the United Kingdom was prosecuted for manslaughter once diplomatic immunity was waived by the Colombian government.

In November 2006 in New York City, Fred Matwanga, Kenyan diplomat to the UN, was taken into police custody by officers responding to reports that he had assaulted his son; he was released after asserting diplomat immunity.

In 2011, Turkish president Erdogan and his team started fighting with UN officials at the United Nations Headquarters. The then secretary general, Ban Ki Moon soon ran over and apologised to Erdogan.

In April 2012 in the Philippines, Erick Shcks Bairnals, a technical officer of the Panama Maritime Authority's regional office in Manila, was accused of raping a 19-year-old Filipino woman. Being an attached agency to the Panamanian embassy in Manila, the AMP office was classified as a diplomatic entity, its officers possessing the same privileges conferred to the embassy's diplomats. Shcks was later released from detention because Shcks "enjoys protection under the 1961 Vienna Convention."

In March 2013, the Supreme Court of India restricted Italian ambassador Daniele Mancini from leaving India for breaching an undertaking given to the apex court. Despite Italian and European Union protests regarding the restrictions as contrary to the Vienna Convention on Diplomatic Relations, the Supreme Court of India said it would be unacceptable to argue diplomatic immunity after voluntarily submitting to the court's jurisdiction. The Italian envoy had invoked Article 32 of the Constitution of India when filing an affidavit to the Supreme Court taking responsibility for the return of the two Italian marines to India after casting their votes in the March 2012 general elections in Italy. The Indian Supreme Court opined that the Italian ambassador had waived his diplomatic immunity and could be charged for contempt. The two marines were being tried in India for the murder of two Indian fishermen off the coast of Kerala (see the Enrica Lexie case).

In October 2013, Russian diplomat Dmitri Borodin was arrested in The Hague, The Netherlands, after neighbours called the police. Borodin was alleged to have been drunk and violent towards his children, aged two and four. Police were in the area because Borodin's wife had lost control over her car while also intoxicated, and had rammed four parked cars near the diplomats' house. Russia immediately demanded an apology from the Dutch government for violating Borodin's diplomatic immunity. The row came at a time of tension between Russia and the Netherlands, after the Russian security services captured a Greenpeace vessel sailing under the Dutch flag, Arctic Sunrise, that was protesting against oil drilling in the Prirazlomnoye field.

In June 2014, the New Zealand government confirmed that Mohammed Rizalman Bin Ismail from Malaysia, aged in his 30s and employed at Malaysia's High Commission in Wellington, had invoked diplomatic immunity when faced with charges of burglary and assault with intent to rape after allegedly following a 21-year-old woman to her home. He returned to Malaysia in May 2014 with his family while the case was still in hearing. The New Zealand foreign ministry was criticized for allowing the defendant to leave the country, which was blamed on miscommunication between the foreign ministries of the two countries, as Prime Minister John Key expressed his view that "the man should have faced the charges in New Zealand". Malaysia eventually agreed to send the diplomat back to assist in investigations and he was eventually tried and sentenced to nine months' home detention in New Zealand.

In July 2017, in Jordan, two Jordanian carpenters were invited to repair furniture at an Israeli diplomatic security agent's residence near the Israeli embassy. It is believed that the Jordanians and Israeli security agent quarreled over the ongoing tensions regarding the installations of metal detectors at entry points to al-Aqsa mosque in Jerusalem. One carpenter, a teenager of Palestinian origin reportedly tried to stab the Israeli security agent with his screwdriver, and the Israeli security agent shot and killed the Jordanian carpenter, and also shot the property landlord as well, a doctor, who happened to be there at the time. Israel refused to allow Jordanian authorities to question the agent, claiming diplomatic immunity under the Vienna convention.

In August 2017, Zimbabwe first lady, Grace Mugabe, invoked diplomatic immunity on 15 August after assault charges were laid against her by a South African model.

In 2018, Saudi American journalist Jamal Khashoggi was killed by Saudi officials inside the Saudi embassy in Turkey. The Turkish police were not allowed to enter the premises days after this death. Furthermore, a Saudi government vehicle with diplomatic license plates was spotted entering a park.

In August 2022, UN diplomat Charles Dickens Imene Oliha of South Sudan's Ministry of Foreign Affairs claimed diplomatic immunity and was released from jail in New York City after raping a woman twice inside her apartment building. He subsequently returned to South Sudan, where he was suspended from his duties and is to be investigated.

Theft
In April 2021, two Pakistani diplomats in South Korea were caught shoplifting in Seoul. The Pakistani diplomats were caught stealing $1.70 chocolate and a $10 hat. The case was closed owing to their diplomatic immunity.

Smuggling
Diplomats and officials involved in drug smuggling have benefited from diplomatic immunity. For example, a Venezuelan general wanted in the United States on drugs charges was arrested in Aruba only to be released after the Venezuelan government protested his diplomatic immunity and threatened sanctions if Aruba did not release him.

In December 2014, Gambian diplomats were found guilty by Southwark Crown Court of London for selling tax-free tobacco from the Gambian embassy in the United Kingdom. The Crown Prosecution Service told the court that much of this was sold from the embassy without paying value-added tax and excise duty.

Employer abuse and slavery
Diplomatic immunity from local employment and labor law has precipitated incidents in which diplomatic staff have been accused of abusing local workers, who are often hired for positions requiring local knowledge (such as an administrative assistant, press/PR officer) or for general labor. In such situations, the employees are in a legal limbo where the laws of neither the host country nor the diplomat's country are enforceable. Diplomats have ignored local laws concerning minimum wages, maximum working hours, vacation and holidays, and in some cases have imprisoned employees in their homes, deprived them of their earned wages, passports, food, and communication with the outside world, abused them physically and emotionally, and invaded their privacy. Reported incidents include the following:
In 1999, a Bangladeshi woman, Shamela Begum, claimed she had been enslaved by a senior Bahraini envoy to the United Nations and his wife. Begum charged that the couple took her passport, struck her, and paid her just $800 for ten months of service—during which she was only twice allowed out of the couple's New York apartment. The envoy and his wife claimed diplomatic immunity, and Begum later reached a civil settlement with her employers. By some estimates, "hundreds of women have been exploited by their diplomat employers over the past 20 years."
In 2003 in Finland, a Filipina maid escaped from an embassy of an unidentified Asian country, and reported being held in conditions approaching slavery: she was forced to work from 7 a.m. to 10 p.m., 7 days a week, and the ambassador's children were permitted to hit her. On grounds of diplomatic immunity, no charges could be filed.
In 2009, South Africa was criticised for claiming immunity from labor laws relating to a Ukrainian domestic worker at the residence of the South African ambassador in Ireland.
In 2010, the American Civil Liberties Union filed an amicus brief in Swarna v. Al-Awadi to argue that human trafficking is a commercial activity engaged in for personal profit, which falls outside the scope of a diplomat's official functions, and therefore diplomatic immunity does not apply. An appeals court ruled that Al-Awadi did not have diplomatic immunity in that situation.
In 2013, Indian consular official Devyani Khobragade was detained, hand-cuffed, strip searched, DNA swabbed, and held in a federal holding cell in New York, relating to allegations of non-payment of US minimum wage and for fraudulently lying about the wages to be paid on a visa application for her domestic worker. India registered a strong protest and initiated a review of privileges afforded to American consular officials in India as a result.
In 2015, two Nepalese women were rescued from the fifth floor of the Gurgaon residence of a Saudi Arabian diplomat in India. They were allegedly confined there and abused physically and sexually by the diplomat and his family and friends. The women were rescued in a police raid planned after the police received a letter from the Nepal embassy regarding their plight. Several persons, the Saudi diplomat among them, were booked for wrongful confinement and gang rape. Saudi Ambassador Saud Mohammed Alsati commented, "This is completely false. We would not like to comment any further since the case is under investigation by the Indian police." Ten days after the diplomat was accused, it was confirmed that he had left India.

Vehicular offences

Parking violations
A particular problem is the difficulty in enforcing ordinary laws, such as prohibitions on double parking. For example, the Autobahn 555 in Cologne, Germany was nicknamed the "Diplomatenrennbahn" (Diplomat's Raceway), when Bonn was the capital of West Germany, because of the numerous diplomats that used to speed through the highway under diplomatic immunity. Certain cities, for example The Hague and New York City have taken to impounding such cars rather than fining their owners. Diplomats' status does not guarantee the release of impounded cars. Diplomats' cars may not be searched or entered in the US.

Diplomatic missions have their own regulations, but many require their staff to pay any fines due for parking violations. A 2006 economic study found that there was a significant correlation between home-country corruption (as measured by Transparency International) and unpaid parking fines: six countries had in excess of 100 violations per diplomat: Kuwait, Egypt, Chad, Sudan, Bulgaria and Mozambique. In particular, New York City, which hosts the United Nations Headquarters, regularly protests to the United States Department of State about nonpayment of parking tickets because of diplomatic status. In 2001, the city had more than 200,000 outstanding parking tickets from diplomats, totaling more than $21.3 million, of which only $160,682 had been collected;  a decade later, the total cost of unpaid parking tickets was over $17 million. In 1997, then-mayor Rudy Giuliani proposed to the Clinton administration that the U.S. State Department revoke the special DPL plates for diplomats who ignore parking summonses; the State Department denied Giuliani's request.

In cities that impose a congestion charge, the decision of some diplomatic missions not to furnish payment has proved controversial. In London, embassies have amassed approximately £58 million in unpaid charges as of 2012, with the American embassy comprising approximately £6 million and the Russian, German and Japanese missions around £2 million each.

Vehicular assault and drunk driving

Georgian driver in the United States
In January 1997, Gueorgui Makharadze, a high-ranking Georgian diplomat, caused a five-car pileup in Washington, D.C., in the United States, which killed a 16-year-old girl. Makharadze's claim of diplomatic immunity created a national outrage in the United States, particularly given Makharadze's previous record of driving offenses: In April 1996, Makharadze had been charged with speeding in Virginia, and four months later, he was detained by District of Columbia police on suspicion of drunk driving. In both prior cases, charges were dismissed based on his immunity. On the basis of the media coverage, Georgia revoked Makharadze's immunity, and he was ultimately sentenced to seven years in prison after pleading guilty to one count of involuntary manslaughter and four counts of aggravated assault.

American driver in Russia
On 27 October 1998, in Vladivostok, Russia, Douglas Kent, the American Consul General to Russia, was involved in a car accident that left a young man, Alexander Kashin, disabled. Kent was not prosecuted in a US court. Under the Vienna Convention, diplomatic immunity does not apply to civil actions relating to vehicular accidents, but in 2006, the United States Court of Appeals for the Ninth Circuit ruled that, since he was using his vehicle for consular purposes, Kent could not be sued civilly.

Russian driver in Canada
In 2001, a Russian diplomat, Andrei Knyazev, hit and killed a woman while driving drunk in Ottawa. Knyazev refused to take a breathalyzer at the scene of the crash, citing diplomatic immunity. Russia refused Canadian requests to waive his immunity, and Knyazev was expelled from Canada. Though the Russian Foreign Ministry fired him and charged him with involuntary manslaughter, and Russian and Canadian authorities cooperated in the investigation, the case caused a political storm in Canada. Many accused the Foreign Ministry of incompetence after it emerged that Knyazev had twice been previously investigated for drunk driving. The Canadian Foreign Minister had fought unsuccessfully to have Knyazev tried in Ottawa. In 2002, Knyazev was found guilty of involuntary manslaughter in Russia.

American driver in Romania
On 3 December 2004, in Bucharest, Romania, Christopher Van Goethem, an American Marine serving his embassy, ran a red traffic signal, collided with a taxi, and killed popular Romanian musician Teo Peter. The Romanian government requested the American government to lift his immunity, which it refused to do. In a court-martial, he was acquitted of manslaughter and adultery (which is still a court martial offence) but was convicted of obstruction of justice and making false statements.

Canadian driver in Tanzania
On 9 December 2009, in Tanzania, Canadian Junior Envoy Jean Touchette was arrested after it was reported that he spat at a traffic police officer on duty in the middle of a traffic jam in the Banana district on the outskirts of Dar es Salaam. Canada's High Commissioner, Robert Orr, was summoned by the Tanzanian Foreign Ministry over the incident, and the junior envoy was later recalled.

Romanian driver in Singapore
On 15 December 2009, in Singapore, the Romanian chargé d'affaires, Silviu Ionescu, was allegedly behind a drunk-driving hit-and-run accident that killed a 30-year-old man and seriously injured two others. He left Singapore for Romania three days after the accident. The Romanian foreign ministry suspended Ionescu from his post. A coroner's inquiry in Singapore, which included testimony by the Romanian embassy driver, concluded that Ionescu was solely responsible for the accident. An Interpol Red Notice was subsequently issued for his arrest and possible extradition notwithstanding the fact that Romania had not waived his diplomatic immunity and had commenced criminal proceedings against him in Romania. The Singapore government argued that by reason of Article 39(2) of the Vienna Convention, Ionescu was no longer protected by diplomatic immunity. Ionescu was eventually sentenced to six years in jail.

American driver in Pakistan
In January 2011 in Lahore, Pakistan, American embassy employee Raymond Allen Davis shot and killed two Pakistani civilians, while a third man was struck and killed by a US consulate car responding to the shooting. According to Davis, they were about to rob him and he acted in self-defense. When detained by police, Davis claimed to be a consultant at the US consulate in Lahore. He was formally arrested and remanded into custody. Further investigations revealed that he was working with the CIA as a contractor in Pakistan. The US State Department declared him a diplomat and repeatedly requested immunity under the Vienna Convention on Diplomatic Relations, to which Pakistan is a signatory. On 16 March 2011, Davis was released after the families of the two killed men were paid $2.4 million in diyya (a form of monetary compensation or blood money). Judges then acquitted him on all charges and Davis immediately departed Pakistan.

United Nations driver in Pakistan
On 10 April 2011, in Islamabad, Pakistan, Patrick Kibuta, an electrical engineer in the United Nations Military Observer Group in India and Pakistan caused a vehicle collision with another vehicle, while under the influence of alcohol. Kibuta, who was driving in the opposing lane, injured a Canadian citizen residing in Islamabad, who suffered multiple fractures and required surgery. The Kohsar police impounded Kibuta's UN vehicle on the scene, and a blood test confirmed that he had an elevated blood alcohol level. Charges for reckless and drunken driving were filed against Kibuta, who enjoyed diplomatic immunity.

American driver in Pakistan
On 14 February 2013, a vehicle bearing diplomatic plates registered to the US Embassy got into an accident in Islamabad, Pakistan involving two residents out of which one was killed and the other survived. Murder charges were laid under Section 320 of Pakistan Penal Code against the driver of the vehicle who is a diplomat according to Pakistani officials.

American driver in Kenya
In July 2013, Joshua Walde, an American diplomat in Nairobi, Kenya, crashed into a mini-bus, killing one man and seriously injuring eight others, who were left with no financial assistance to pay for hospital bills. United States embassy officials took the diplomat and his family out of Kenya the following day. The United States government was concerned about the impact the accident could have on bilateral relations with Kenya. Walde gave a statement to police, but was not detained due to his diplomatic immunity. Kenyan police say the case remains under investigation.

Lebanese driver in South Korea
In September 2013, Jad Saeed al-Hassan, Lebanese Ambassador to South Korea, was involved in a hit-and-run in Seoul. Right after the accident, he drove directly into the Lebanese embassy compound and refused to cooperate with the local police investigation, claiming his diplomatic immunity. He stayed in his post as ambassador until his death due to another traffic collision in Seoul in 2014.

Qatari driver in the United States
On 12 September 2015, Sheikh Khalid bin Hamad Al Thani tried to claim diplomatic immunity when his Ferrari LaFerrari and a Porsche 911 GT3 were caught on camera drag racing through a residential neighborhood in Beverly Hills. He owns the cars and a drag racing team, and is a member of Qatar's ruling family. The Beverly Hills Police Department contacted the US State Department to clarify if he had diplomatic immunity. They stated he did not. However, his face was not shown on camera, and no officer witnessed the crime, so the state of California has not yet pressed charges. He has since fled the country. The investigation is ongoing.

Saudi driver in Germany
In June 2017, in Germany a Saudi driver killed a cyclist by opening the door of his Porsche directly into the cyclist's path without checking to see if the road was clear. Anger arose when the Saudi claimed diplomatic immunity. Police said that under normal circumstances the driver would face investigation and possible prosecution on suspicion of negligent manslaughter, but prosecutors said they had no choice but to close the case because he had diplomatic immunity.

American driver in the United Kingdom

On 27 August 2019, Anne Sacoolas, the wife of an American government employee working in the United Kingdom was a suspect in a traffic incident involving 19-year-old Harry Dunn in Croughton, Northamptonshire, England. Dunn was riding his motorcycle when it was reported that a woman emerged from RAF Croughton driving on the wrong side of the road, resulting in a head-on collision. After 999 handlers wrongly categorized the call, there was a 43-minute wait for an ambulance, resulting in a two-hour delay arriving at a trauma center, where Harry Dunn later died. Sacoolas was breathalyzed at the accident site. The following day, police interviewed Sacoolas at her home, learning the US claimed diplomatic immunity.

Sacoolas told police she had no immediate plans to leave the country. However, on 13 October US authorities notified the UK's Foreign and Commonwealth Office of plans to send Sacoolas home, unless serious objections were raised: on 16 October, the UK's Foreign Secretary, Dominic Raab, went to present objections, a day after the family was sent back.

Woody Johnson, U.S. Ambassador to the UK, expressed "profound sadness" at the death of Harry Dunn and the US Embassy also offered their sympathies and condolences. U.S. President Donald Trump called it a "terrible accident" and mentioned that the woman was "driving on the wrong side of the road, and that can happen". The US government has not waived the diplomatic immunity afforded to Sacoolas and has stated she would not return to the UK, despite calls by the UK government to do so.

However, as of December 2021 Sacoolas is scheduled to appear in UK court via video link charged with causing the death of Mr Dunn by dangerous driving. The hearing will take place in Westminster Magistrates Court on the 18th January 2022.

Financial abuse
Historically, the problem of large debts run up by diplomats has also caused many problems. Some financial institutions do not extend credit to diplomats because they have no legal means of ensuring the money be repaid. Local citizens and businesses are often at a disadvantage when filing civil claims against a diplomat, especially in cases of unpaid rent, alimony, and child support.

Rents

The bulk of diplomatic debt lies in the rental of office space and living quarters. Individual debts can range from a few thousand dollars to $1 million in back rent. A group of diplomats and the office space in which they work are referred to as a diplomatic mission. Creditors cannot sue missions individually to collect money they owe. Landlords and creditors have found that the only thing they can do is contact a city agency to see if they can try to get some money back. They cannot enter the offices or apartments of diplomats to evict them because the Foreign Sovereign Immunities Act says that "the property in the United States of a foreign state shall be immune from attachment, arrest and execution". This has led creditors who are owed money by diplomats to become more cautious about their renters and to change their rental or payment policies.

In one case, for example, officials from Zaire stopped paying rent to their private landlord and ran up $400,000 in debt. When the landlord sued, the US State Department defended the Zaireans on the basis of diplomatic immunity, and a circuit court agreed. When the landlord finally cut off the utilities, the officials fled without paying their back rent. The landlords reportedly later reached an "amicable agreement" with the Zaire government.

Alimony and child support
The issue of abusing diplomatic immunity in family relations, especially alimony and child support, has become so widespread that it prompted discussion at the 1995 UN Fourth World Conference on Women, in Beijing. Historically, the United Nations has not become involved with family disputes and has refused to garnish the wages of diplomats who owe money for child support, citing sovereign immunity. However, in September 1995, the incumbent head of Legal Affairs for the United Nations acknowledged there was a moral and legal obligation to take at least a partial responsibility in family disputes. Fathers working as diplomats who refused to fulfill their family-related financial duties were increasing in numbers in the United Nations: several men who had left their wives and children were still claiming UN dependency, travel, and education allowances for their families, though they are no longer supporting those families.

Taxes and fees
Diplomats are exempt from most taxes, but not from "charges levied for specific services rendered". In certain cases, whether a payment is or is not considered a tax may be disputed, such as central London's congestion charge. It was reported in 2006 that the UAE embassy had agreed to pay their own accumulated charges of nearly £100,000.

There is an obligation for the receiving state not to "discriminate as between states"; in other words, any such fees should be payable by all accredited diplomats equally. This may allow the diplomatic corps to negotiate as a group with the authorities of the receiving country.

Diplomats are exempt from import duty and tariffs for items for their personal use. In some countries, this has led to charges that diplomatic agents are profiting personally from resale of "tax free" goods. The receiving state may choose to impose restrictions on what may reasonably constitute personal use (for example, only a certain quantity of cigarettes per day). When enacted, such restrictions are generally quite generous so as to avoid tit-for-tat responses.

Money laundering 
United States v. Al Sharaf is a criminal case which was filed by the government on March 5, 2015 in the United States District Court, District of Columbia. Al Sharaf was a Kuwaiti Financial Attaché assigned to handle the finances of Kuwait Health Office in Washington, D.C. She was charged by the government as she had violated 18 U.S.C § 1956 for conspiring to launder money. Al Sharaf filed a motion to dismiss the case on the basis of lack of subject matter jurisdiction because as per the 22 U.S.C § 254d her actions were immune under the diplomatic immunity that she had. Since it was a criminal case, the prosecution presented evidence beyond a reasonable doubt to prove that Al Sharaf had engaged in commercial activity and her actions were different from her official functions as a representative of Kuwait, thereby, as per the VCDR art. 31(c) her diplomatic immunity was subject to waiver. The court ruled in prosecution's favor and stated that since the defendant had engaged in commercial activity which was different from her official functions, her diplomatic immunity was subject to waiver and hence the defendant's motion to dismiss the case on the basis of lack of subject matter jurisdiction was denied.

Espionage
On 24 April 2008, in New Orleans, Mexican press attaché Rafael Quintero Curiel was seen stealing BlackBerry PDA units from a White House press meeting room. Quintero made it all the way to the airport before members of the United States Secret Service caught up with him. He initially denied taking the devices, but after being confronted with security video, Quintero claimed it was purely accidental, gave the devices back, claimed diplomatic immunity and left New Orleans with the Mexican delegation. He was eventually fired for the incident.

In 2021, it was reported that the UAE embassy in Canberra was building non-compliant fences and installing a lot of CCTV.

In the United States

The following chart outlines the immunities afforded to foreign diplomatic personnel residing in the United States. In general, these rules follow the Vienna Convention (or the New York Convention for UN officials) and apply in other countries as well (with the exceptions of immunities for United Nations officials, which can vary widely across countries based on the "Host Country Agreement" signed between the UN and the host country, whereby additional immunities beyond those granted by the New York Convention may be established).

Notes

References

Further reading
 David B. Michaels, International privileges and immunities: A case for a universal statute, Springer, July 1971, 
 "Diplomatic and Consular Immunity: Guidance for Law Enforcement and Judicial Authorities" - United States Department of State Office of Foreign Missions.

External links
 New York City Mayor's Office for International Affairs
 Vienna Convention on Diplomatic Relations, 1961
 Vienna Convention on Consular Relations (VCCR), 1963

Rules of the road